The Anglican Diocese of Abuja is one of 13 within the Anglican Province of Abuja, itself one of 14 provinces within the Church of Nigeria.The current bishop is Archbishop Henry Ndukuba, who is also Primate of the Church of Nigeria.

Notes

Dioceses of the Province of Abuja
 
Church of Nigeria dioceses